Lunania cubensis is a species of plant in the Flacourtiaceae family. It is endemic to Cuba.

References

Flora of Cuba
cubensis
Vulnerable plants
Taxa named by Nikolai Turczaninow
Taxonomy articles created by Polbot